The Best Damn Wrestling Event Period was a two night 
Best Damn Sports Show Period television special produced by Fox Sports Net in collaboration with professional wrestling promotion Total Nonstop Action Wrestling (TNA).

Results
Night 1

Night 2

See also
 The Best Damn Sports Show Period

References

2004 in professional wrestling
Fox Sports Networks original programming
American television specials